Farmington is a city in St. Francois County located about  southwest of St. Louis in the Lead Belt region in Missouri. As of the 2020 census, the population was 18,217. It is the county seat of St. Francois County. Farmington was established in 1822 as Murphy's Settlement, named for William Murphy of Kentucky, who first visited the site in 1798. When St. Francois County was organized, the town was briefly called St. Francois Court House and later renamed to Farmington.

History
William Murphy, arrived on the land west of the Mississippi River in 1798, when it was part of the upper Louisiana Territory and under Spanish rule. Calderon was searching for the ideal site to relocate his family and, as the tradition goes, came to find a spring near what is now the St. Francois County Courthouse with the aid of a local Native American. Deciding that this was an excellent place to set up home, Murphy acquired a Spanish Land Grant, allowing him and his family to establish a settlement along the St. Francois River.

In his travels back to Kentucky, Murphy died, leaving it up to his wife, Sarah, and their grown sons to establish the settlement, which they did around 1800, and named the area Murphy's Settlement. Sarah is known to have assembled the premier Protestant Sunday School west of the Mississippi River. Because Spanish law barred any religious services that were not Roman Catholic, Sarah and her students orchestrated the learning in secret.

A post office in Murphy's Settlement opened in 1817, following the annexation of the land to the United States in 1803 as part of the Louisiana Purchase. Missouri became a state in 1821 as part of the Missouri Compromise. Murphy's Settlement was renamed Farmington in 1825, taking the name from the area's rich farm land. Farmington was granted incorporation as a town in 1836 and became a village 20 years later in 1856.

In the mid-19th century, Farmington enjoyed growth and economic well-being through the building of the historic Plank Road, which stretched from Pilot Knob to Ste. Genevieve. The road was built to transport both supplies from the shipping facilities located along the river to the mines and to move the mine's iron ore to the shipping facilities. The route was soon taken over by the St. Louis, Iron Mountain and Southern Railway.

The first public school was constructed in 1870 and in 1879. Farmington gained the recognition as a fourth-class city–an accolade that was surpassed in 1981 when Farmington became a third-class city.

The Courthouse Square Historic District, East Columbia Historic District, Farmington State Hospital No. 4 Cemetery, James Robinson McCormick House, Presbyterian Orphanage of Missouri, and St. Francois County Jail and Sheriff's Residence are listed on the National Register of Historic Places.

Geography
Farmington is located at  (37.781932, −90.422145).

Climate
Average temperatures in the following chart are taken from National Weather Service averages from 1991 to 2020.

Demographics
The Farmington Micropolitan Statistical Area includes St. Francois County and Washington County and has a population of 90,554 as of 2010. Farmington is a component of the St. Louis-St. Charles-Farmington, MO-IL Combined Statistical Area, also known as Greater St. Louis.

2010 census
As of the census of 2010, there were 16,240 people, 5,620 households, and 3,313 families living in the city. The racial makeup of the city was 90.26% White, 7.14% Black or African American, 0.32% Native American, 0.80% Asian, 0.04% Native Hawaiian or Pacific Islander, 0.30% from other races, and 1.13% from two or more races. Hispanic or Latino of any race were 1.52% of the population.

There were 5,620 households, of which 30.6% had children under the age of 18 living with them, 40.8% were married couples living together, 13.8% had a female householder with no husband present, 4.4% had a male householder with no wife present, and 41.0% were non-families. 34.7% of all households were made up of individuals, and 15.9% had someone living alone who was 65 years of age or older. The average household size was 2.26 and the average family size was 2.88.

The median age in the city was 37.6 years. 19% of residents were under the age of 18; 9.9% were between the ages of 18 and 24; 31.2% were from 25 to 44; 24.7% were from 45 to 64; and 15.1% were 65 years of age or older. The gender makeup of the city was 56.3% male and 43.7% female.

2000 census
As of the census of 2000, there were 13,924 people, 4,647 households, and 2,909 families living in the city. The population density was 1,555.0 people per square mile (600.7/km). There were 5,003 housing units at an average density of 558.7 per square mile (215.8/km). The racial makeup of the city was 89.73% White, 7.36% African American, 0.50% Native American, 0.73% Asian, 0.01% Pacific Islander, 0.32% from other races, and 1.34% from two or more races. Hispanic or Latino of any race were 1.16% of the population.

There were 4,647 households, out of which 28.6% had children under the age of 18 living with them, 47.7% were married couples living together, 11.6% had a female householder with no husband present, and 37.4% were non-families. 32.5% of all households were made up of individuals, and 14.8% had someone living alone who was 65 years of age or older. The average household size was 2.28 and the average family size was 2.88.

In the city the population was spread out, with 18.9% under the age of 18, 10.6% from 18 to 24, 33.5% from 25 to 44, 20.0% from 45 to 64, and 17.1% who were 65 years of age or older. The median age was 37 years. For every 100 females, there were 131.3 males. For every 100 females age 18 and over, there were 137.7 males.

The median income for a household in the city was $30,251, and the median income for a family was $39,899. Males had a median income of $27,448 versus $20,330 for females. The per capita income for the city was $14,706. About 8.9% of families and 12.4% of the population were below the poverty line, including 16.3% of those under age 18 and 8.4% of those age 65 or over.

Religion
Approximately 51.21% of the people in Farmington identify themselves as religious or affiliated with a religion. Many of these religious residents identify as Christians—38.08% are Protestants, 7.65% are Roman Catholics, 5.03% identify with another Christian faith, 0.43% are Mormons,  0.03% belong to an Eastern religion, and 0.01% are Jewish.

Economy
It is home to an SRG Global manufacturing plant, and U.S. Tool  Other major employers in the city are BJC Parkland Health Center, Centene Corp, Farmington Correctional Center and Southeast Missouri Mental Health Center.

Government

Farmington's publicly elected government consists of a Mayor and eight City Council members representing the city's four wards who set city policy. The city's policies are carried out by a City Administrator who works closely with the City Clerk, City Council and City Attorney.

Education

Public schools
The Farmington R-VII School District serves the city's need for public education. According to the Missouri Department of Elementary and Secondary Education, there are five elementary schools, two being private, one public intermediate school, one middle school, and one high school in the school district for a total of nine schools. During the 2008–2009 school year, there was a total of 3,743 students and 306 certified staff members enrolled in the Farmington R-VII School District. The school colors are black and gold and the mascot is the knight (knightette for females). Athletics offered in the school district include boys' and girls' basketball, cross country, soccer, swimming, tennis, track, boys' baseball, golf, football, wrestling, and girls' softball and girls' volleyball. Other activities include band (marching, jazz, and concert) cheerleading, colorguard, winter guard, dance team, FFA, AFJROTC, TSA, and FBLA.

Elementary

 Jefferson Elementary
 Lincoln Intermediate
 Roosevelt Elementary
 Truman Kindergarten
  Washington-Franklin Elementary
  W.L. Johns Early Childhood Center

Secondary

 Farmington Middle School
 Farmington Senior High School
  Juvenile Detention Center
 Midwest Learning Center

Private schools
Farmington is also home to two private schools.

 St. Joseph Catholic School (PK-8)
 St. Paul Lutheran School (PK-8)
 St. Paul Lutheran High School (9-12)

Public library
Farmington has a lending library, the Farmington Public Library.

Attractions
 Farmington has a park system, with major parks including Engler Park, Wilson-Rozier Park, and Trimfoot park.
 St. Joe State Park is right outside the city limits and attracts ATV riders, campers, horseback riders, bicyclists, and swimmers.  The park has recently added an outdoor gun range.

Infrastructure
Farmington is located at the crossroads of US 67 and Missouri Hwy 32.

Notable people

Sam Agnew, Major League Baseball catcher
Jake Arrieta, Major League Baseball pitcher, 2015 NL Cy Young Award winner
 Herbert Asbury, writer, was born in Farmington. He later published a controversial chapter about a prostitute from Farmington in Up From Methodism, which was seen as a liability for The American Mercury
Ed Blaine, former NFL player
Jesse McI. Carter, United States Army major general in World War I
Walter Lewis Hensley, US Representative
Andrew Conway Ivy, physiologist
Lloyd McBride, labor leader
James Robinson McCormick, US Representative
Greggory Nations, writer and co-producer of Lost TV series, also affiliated with the series Bates Motel
Dan Peek, founding member of the band America, lived in Farmington from 1978 until his death in 2011
Barney Pelty, Major League Baseball pitcher
Kyle Richardson, NFL punter, member of Super Bowl XXXV champion Baltimore Ravens
Charles E. Sebastian, Mayor of Los Angeles
Alex White, professional mixed martial artist in UFC
J. Ernest Wilkins Sr., attorney, civil rights advocate, labor leader, and undersecretary of labor in the Eisenhower administration
Robert Moore Williams, writer
Tim Lollar, Major League Baseball pitcher

References

External links
 City of Farmington
 City of Farmington Municipal Code
  Farmington Regional Chamber of Commerce
  Farmington Missouri News
 Historic maps of Farmington in the Sanborn Maps of Missouri Collection at the University of Missouri

Cities in St. Francois County, Missouri
County seats in Missouri
Populated places established in 1822
1822 establishments in Missouri
Cities in Missouri